Matías Ezequiel Rodríguez (born 10 August 1987) is an Argentine footballer who plays as a forward.

Career
Rodríguez started his senior career with Newell's Old Boys of the Argentine Primera División. He failed to make an appearance for the first-team, but did spend a season out on loan with Talleres in Torneo Argentino A. Rodríguez left Newell's in 2010 and subsequently joined Peruvian Torneo Descentralizado side Colegio Nacional Iquitos. He made his professional debut in a 1–1 draw with José Gálvez on 14 August 2010. Rodríguez departed at the end of the 2010 season after eight total appearances, he then permanently rejoined Talleres; then in Torneo Argentino B.

References

External links

1987 births
Living people
Place of birth missing (living people)
Argentine footballers
Association football forwards
Argentine expatriate footballers
Expatriate footballers in Peru
Argentine expatriate sportspeople in Peru
Argentine Primera División players
Torneo Argentino A players
Peruvian Primera División players
Torneo Argentino B players
Newell's Old Boys footballers
Talleres de Perico footballers
Colegio Nacional Iquitos footballers